Căianu is a commune in Cluj County, Transylvania, Romania. It is composed of six villages: Bărăi (Báré), Căianu, Căianu Mic (Kiskályán), Căianu-Vamă (Kályánivám), Vaida-Cămăraș (Vajdakamarás) and Văleni (Lárgatanya).

Demographics

According to the 2011 census, Romanians made up 58.1% of the population, Hungarians made up 36.3% and Roma made up 2.5%.

References

Communes in Cluj County
Localities in Transylvania